Pyrgocythara nodulosa is a species of sea snail, a marine gastropod mollusk in the family Mangeliidae.

Description

Distribution
This marine species occurs in the Naska Ridge, Southeast Pacific

References

 Sysoev A.V.; Ivanov D.L., 1985: New taxa of the family turridae gastropoda toxoglossa from the naska ridge southeast pacific. Zoologicheskii Zhurnal 64(2): 194–205

External links
 Census of Marine Life (2012). SYNDEEP: Towards a first global synthesis of biodiversity, biogeography and ecosystem function in the deep sea. Unpublished data (datasetID: 59)
 

nodulosa
Gastropods described in 1985